John Blaker Mattiford (June 24, 1916 – April 6, 1960) was an American football player. He played college football for Marshall University and professional football in the National Football League (NFL) for the Detroit Lions. He appeared in 10 NFL games during the 1941 season. In his college and professional career, he played variously at the guard, end, back, tackle, and placekicker positions. He kicked 20 extra points for Marshall in 1940. The Associated Press referred to him as "the handy man of the 1941 Lions eleven."

References

1916 births
1960 deaths
American football guards
Detroit Lions players
Marshall Thundering Herd football players
People from Harrison County, West Virginia
Players of American football from West Virginia